Gaussiran Glacier is a glacier in the eastern part of the Britannia Range, Antarctica. It drains north from the saddle with Merrick Glacier to a juncture with Darwin Glacier between the Cranfield Icefalls and the Nebraska Peaks.  It is separated from Alley Glacier by a series of large rock buttresses, including Robertson Buttress.

It was named by the Advisory Committee on Antarctic Names after Lieutenant C.D. Gaussiran, U.S. Navy, a pilot with the VXE-6 detachment at Darwin Glacier Field Camp, 1978–79.

See also
 List of glaciers in the Antarctic
 Glaciology

References

Glaciers of Oates Land